A Replogle tube is a medical device used in the treatment of babies with esophageal atresia or other blockages of the gastro intestinal tract. It is a double-lumen tube which is inserted through the baby's nostril or mouth into the stomach (or blind-end pouch). This provides decompression to a distended abdomen and also avoids backup of gas, stool or secretions overflowing into the trachea (windpipe) and causing problems such as aspiration pneumonia

Replogle tubes can be flushed regularly with saline and attached to suction help remove secretions, stool, or excess air.

Normally, a Replogle tube is used only for hours or days while the baby develops or awaits surgical intervention, but in cases where surgery has to be delayed a Replogle may be needed for weeks or even months.

References

External links
 Great Ormond Street Hospital's guidelines on Replogle tube care

Medical devices